A short-coupled aircraft or close-coupled aircraft is an aircraft with a relatively short distance between the wing and empennage (tail assembly) or whatever is used to provide the force that is used to balance the aircraft along its longitudinal axis.  Due to the short moment arm, the empennage has to produce a greater force than usual - often by being larger than for a conventional aircraft, otherwise the aircraft will be sensitive to pilot-induced oscillation. All tandem wing aircraft and many flying wings are short-coupled.

Examples include the Flying Flea and the Saab Viggen.

Aerospace technologies